The 29th Sports Emmy Awards honoring American sports coverage in 2007 was presented on April 28, 2008 at Frederick P. Rose Hall in the Jazz at Lincoln Center, New York City. The nominees were announced on March 13.

Awards

Programs

{|class=wikitable
|-
!style="width:50%"|Outstanding Live Sports Special
!style="width:50%"|Outstanding Live Sports Series
|-
|valign="top"|
 ''BCS on FOX: Tostitos Fiesta Bowl, FOX 2007 Open Championship, ABC/ESPN
 2007 AFC Championship Game, CBS
 2007 Daytona 500, FOX
 NFL Wild Card Playoff: Dallas vs. Seattle, NBC
 Super Bowl XLI, CBS
|valign="top"|
 NASCAR on FOX, FOX Monday Night Football, ESPN
 NBA on ESPN/NBA on ABC, ESPN/ABC
 NBC Golf Tour, NBC
 NFL on FOX, FOX
 NBC Sunday Night Football, NBC
|-
!style="width:50%"|Outstanding Live Event Turnaround
!style="width:50%"|Outstanding Edited Sports Special
|-
|valign="top"|
 Quest for the Cup, VOOM De La Hoya vs Mayweather Delay Broadcast, HBO
 Inside the PGA Tour, PGA Tour Productions
 NFL Mic'd Up: Ravens vs. 49ers, NFL Network
 2007 Tour de France, CBS
|valign="top"|
 De La Hoya-Mayweather 24/7, HBO Super Bowl 360, ESPN
 2007 Ironman World Championship, NBC
 The Natural: Major League Baseball Celebrates an Epic, ESPN2
 Unsettled Scores, ESPN2
|-
!style="width:50%"|Outstanding Sports Documentary
!style="width:50%"|Outstanding Edited Sports Series/Anthology
|-
|valign="top"|
 Ghosts of Flatbush, HBO Barbaro: A Nation's Horse, NBC
 Dale, NASCAR Images
 Jonestown: The Game of Their Lives, ESPN
 Triumph and Tragedy: The Ray Mancini Story, ESPN Classic
|valign="top"|
 America's Game: The Super Bowl Champions, NFL Networks Greatest High School Football Rivalries, Versus
 Hard Knocks: Training Camp with the Kansas City Chiefs, HBO
 HBO Boxing: Countdown Shows, HBO
 Real Sports with Bryant Gumbel, HBO
|-
!style="width:50%"|Outstanding Studio Show, Weekly
!style="width:50%"|Outstanding Studio Show, Daily
|-
|valign="top"|
 College Gameday, ESPN [[Football Night in America, NBC
 Inside the NBA, TNT
 Inside the NFL, HBO
 FOX NFL Sunday, FOX
|valign="top"|
 Inside the NBA, TNT NASCAR Now, ESPN2
 Pardon the Interruption, ESPN
 SportsCenter, ESPN
 Wimbledon Tonight, NBC
|-
!style="width:50%"|Outstanding Sports Journalism
!style="width:50%"|Outstanding Short Feature
|-
|valign="top"|
 Real Sports with Bryant Gumbel - Headgames: The NFL Concussion Crisis, HBO Real Sports with Bryant Gumbel - Broken: The NFL Disability Debate, HBO
 Real Sports with Bryant Gumbel - Dogfighting: Bred to Die, HBO
 Real Sports with Bryant Gumbel - Fading Hope: Sprots in Iraq, HBO
|valign="top"|
 Sunday NFL Countdown - Fear, ESPN College Gameday - Martin van Zant, ESPN
 Inside the NFL - Coal Miner's Sons: The Jones Brothers, HBO
 Inside the NFL - Packers Fans Rebuild, HBO
 MLB 2007: Never Miss A Game - Never Too Early, ESPN
|-
!style="width:50%"|Outstanding Long Feature
!style="width:50%"|Outstanding Open/Tease
|-
|valign="top"|
 NFL Films Presents: Finding Your Butkus, NFL Network E:60 - Ray of Hope, ESPN
 NBA TV Game Night - 59th and Prairie: Dwyane Wade's Journey - A Story Told by Terrence Howard, NBC TV
 Outside the Lines - Still Alive, ESPN
 The Super Bowl Today - Bill Walsh, CBS
 The Super Bowl Today - Hines Ward, CBS
|valign="top"|
 Super Bowl XLI - Tease, CBS 107th U.S. Open Championship - The Open Returns to Steel City, NBC
 2007 Scripps National Spelling Bee - Championship Round, ABC
 Barbaro: A Nation's Horse, NBC
 De La Hoya-Mayweather 24/7 - Episode 1, HBO
 Indianapolis 500 - Tease: All Roads Lead to Indy, ABC
 NBA Playoffs - Opening Night Tease, TNT
|-
!style="width:50%"|Outstanding New Approaches - Coverage
!style="width:50%"|Outstanding New Approaches - Long Form
|-
|valign="top"|
 Fantasy Football Now, ESPN.com Amen Corner Live, CBSSports.com
 Fantasy Focus Baseball, ESPN.com
 Fantasy Football Live, Yahoo! Sports
 Live@ Series, PGATour.com
 NFL.com LIVE, NFL Network
|valign="top"|
 Ray of Hope, ESPN.com Kevin Streelman, 24 Hours to the PGA Tour, PGA Tour Productions
 2007 Shared Summits K2 Expedition, NBCSports.com
 Fan Life: Full Tilt Full Time, HBO
 Ruth Lovelace: Chasing a Dream, NBCSports.com
|-
!style="width:50%"|Outstanding New Approaches - General Interest
|style="background:#FFF; border-bottom:1px solid #FFF; border-right:1px solid #FFF"|
|-
|valign="top"|
 Death Race 2007, ESPN.com An UnAmerican Tragedy, ESPN.com
 Anatomy of a Play, NFL Network
 Don't Be Like Mike, ESPN.com
 Inside Spring Training with the White Sox, 312 Media
|style="background:#FFF; border-top:1px solid #FFF; border-bottom:1px solid #FFF; border-right:1px solid #FFF"|
|}

Personalities

{|class=wikitable
|-
!style="width:50%"|Outstanding Sports Personality, Studio Host
!style="width:50%"|Outstanding Sports Personality, Play-by-Play
|-
|valign="top"|
 James Brown, CBS Al Trautwig, Versus
 Bob Costas, HBO/NBC
 Bryant Gumbel, HBO
 Ernie Johnson, Jr., TNT/TBS
|valign="top"|
 Al Michaels, NBC Jim Lampley, HBO
 Jim Nantz, CBS
 Joe Buck, FOX
 Marv Albert, TNT
 Mike Emrick, NBC
|-
!style="width:50%"|Outstanding Sports Personality, Studio Analyst
!style="width:50%"|Outstanding Sports Personality, Sports Event Analyst
|-
|valign="top"|
 Cris Collinsworth, HBO/NBC Charles Barkley, TNT
 Cris Carter, HBO
 Jay Bilas, ESPN
 Terry Bradshaw, FOX
 Tom Jackson, ESPN
|valign="top"|
 John Madden, NBC Doug Collins, TNT
 Gary Danielson, CBS
 Phil Simms, CBS
 Tim McCarver, FOX
 Troy Aikman, FOX
|}

Technical
{|class=wikitable
|-
!style="width:50%"|Outstanding Technical Team Remote
!style="width:50%"|Outstanding Technical Team Studio
|-
|valign="top"|
 ESPN NASCAR, ABC/ESPN/ESPN2 NASCAR on FOX, FOX NBC Golf Tour, NBC
 NFL on FOX, FOX
 Red Bull Air Race World Series, FSN
|valign="top"|
 MLB Postseason on TBS, TBS Football Night in America, ABC
 NASCAR on FOX, FOX
 NFL on FOX: FOX NFL Sunday, FOX
 The NFL Today, CBS
|-
!style="width:50%"|Outstanding Camera Work
!style="width:50%"|Outstanding Editing
|-
|valign="top"|
 Mayweather-Hatton 24/7, HBO Down the Barrel, ESPN2
 Focused - Human Flight, Rush HD
 Focused - The Future of Freestyle Skiing 2007, Rush HD
 Inside the NFL, HBO
 Road to the Super Bowl, NFL Network
 2007 Ironman World Championship, NBC
|valign="top"|
 Ali's 65, ESPN Hard Knocks: Training Camp With the Kansas City Chiefs, HBO
 Mayweather-Hatton 24/7, HBO
 Sports Science, FSN
 Sunday NFL Countdown - Fear, ESPN
 Super Bowl XLI, CBS
|-
!style="width:50%"|The Dick Schaap Writing Award
!style="width:50%"|Outstanding Music Direction/Composition/Lyrics
|-
|valign="top"|
 Mayweather-Hatton 24/7, HBO 2007 ING New York City Marathon - Alec Baldwin Open, NBC
 Costas Now - The Year of the Cheat, HBO
 E:60 - A Dream Come True: Gunnar Esiason, ESPN
 Every Man a Tiger: The Eddie Robinson Story, NBC
 Inside the NFL - Lewis Black: Miami Vice & Lonely in LA, HBO
|valign="top"|
 Ghosts of Flatbush, HBO Hard Knocks: Training Camp with the Kansas City Chiefs, HBO NBA on TNT - NBA Promos on TNT, TNT America's Game: The Super Bowl Champions, NFL Network
 Barbaro, HBO
 Dale, NASCAR Images
 Kabul Girls Club, ESPN2
 US Open Tennis Championship - Tease, CBS
|-
!style="width:50%"|Outstanding Live Event Audio/Sound
!style="width:50%"|Outstanding Post Produced Audio/Sound
|-
|valign="top"|
 MLB on FOX, FOX Arena Football, ABC/ESPN/ESPN2
 NASCAR on FOX, FOX
 NHL on NBC, NBC
 World Championship Boxing]], HBO
|valign="top"|
 MLB on FOX: Pre Game Show, FOX US Open Tennis Championship, CBS NFL on FOX: FOX NFL Sunday, FOX
 Road to the Super Bowl, NFL Network
|-
!style="width:50%"|Outstanding Graphic Design
!style="width:50%"|Outstanding Production Design/Art Direction
|-
|valign="top"|
 Sport Science, FSN ESPN NASCAR, ABC/ESPN/ESPN2
 Football Night in America/NBC Sunday Night Football, NBC
 NBA on TNT - Playoffs, TNT
 NBA Finals on ABC - Tease/Open, ABC
|valign="top"|
 NBA All-Star Saturday Night - Tease and various re-teases, TNT 107th U.S. Open Championship - The Open Returns to the Steel City, NBC
 Amazing Sport Stories, FSN
 BCS on FOX, FOX
 NBA All-Star Game - Wasteland Tease, TNT
 Sport Science, FSN
|-
!style="width:50%"|The George Wensel Technical Achievement Award
|style="background:#FFF; border-bottom:1px solid #FFF; border-right:1px solid #FFF"|
|-
|valign="top"|
 PGA TOUR and LPGA Coverage - AimPoint, Golf Channel ESPN NASCAR - Draft Track, ABC/ESPN/ESPN2
 Golf on CBS - Swing Vision, CBS
 Jim Nantz Remembers Augusta - The 1960 Masters - Color Restoration and Colorization, CBS
 Sport Science - Sport Science Laboratory, FSN
|style="background:#FFF; border-top:1px solid #FFF; border-bottom:1px solid #FFF; border-right:1px solid #FFF"|
|}

Sports Lifetime Achievement AwardFrank Chirkinian'', Golf producer

References

 029
Sports Emmy Awards